The Jordan Davis Cup team represents Jordan in Davis Cup tennis competition and are governed by the Jordan Tennis Federation.

Jordan currently compete in the Asia/Oceania Zone of Group IV.  They competed in Group II from 1989 to 1993, but failed advance beyond the first round.

History
Jordan competed in its first Davis Cup in 1989.

Current team (2022) 

 Abedallah Shelbayh
 Mohammad Alkotop (Junior player)
 Seif Adas
 Hamzeh Al-Aswad
 Mousa Alkotop

See also
Davis Cup
Jordan Fed Cup team

External links

Davis Cup teams
Davis Cup
Davis Cup